Gary Frank (born 1969) is a British comics artist, notable for pencilling on Midnight Nation and Supreme Power, both written by J. Michael Straczynski. He has also worked with author Peter David on The Incredible Hulk and Supergirl. He had a creator-owned series, Kin, which he wrote himself, published by Top Cow Productions in 2000.

Writer Geoff Johns, who has collaborated with Frank, has opined that Frank's rendition of Superman is the best of his generation and that the only other artist in the same league with Frank in this regard is Curt Swan.

Comics career

1990
Gary Frank began his professional career in 1991, illustrating covers and interior short stories for publications such as Doctor Who Magazine and Toxic!. This led to a stint at Marvel UK in 1992 as regular series' artist on Motormouth & Killpower. It was on that series that he began a long-running collaboration with inker Cam Smith, who would continue to ink Frank's work for many years. In 1992, Frank was recruited by Marvel Comics to illustrate covers for The Incredible Hulk, beginning with issue No. 400. Shortly thereafter, he was hired as the series' ongoing artist beginning with issue No. 403 (March 1993) and ending with No. 425 (Jan. 1995).

During his initial time at Marvel, Frank contributed covers, interiors and pin-up illustrations for various series, such as X-Men Unlimited, the Sabretooth Special, X-Men Classic, X-Men Prime, and Doctor Strange, Sorcerer Supreme, among others. He drew covers for Acclaim Comics' Ninjak and Harris Comics' Vampirella.

In 1996, Frank and Smith were hired as the art team on DC Comics' new Supergirl ongoing series, which re-teamed Frank with writer Peter David. Frank's run as penciller ended with issue No. 9 (May 1997), although he continued to provide covers for the series until issue No. 21. Other assignments for DC included a Birds of Prey one-shot and the DC/Marvel Amalgam Comics one-shot, Bullets and Bracelets.

In 1997, Frank and Smith moved to Image Comics, where they, along with writer John Arcudi, were hired as the new creative team on the Wildstorm title Gen¹³, beginning with the epilogue story in issue No. 25. Their run on the series was praised for its dark, realistic style in both writing and art; however, the drastic change in tone and style alienated many longtime fans who had grown accustomed to the more fantastical and cartoonish approach of the Brandon Choi/J. Scott Campbell run. The Arcudi/Frank/Smith tenure on the series lasted two years, until issue No. 41 (July 1999). It was during this run, in 1998, that Wildstorm head Jim Lee moved his studio and all its properties to DC Comics. Therefore, issues No. 25–36 were published by Image and issues No. 37–41 were published by DC/Wildstorm.

2000s
In 2000, Frank worked on various assignments for both DC and Marvel, including issue No. 7 of Tom Strong under DC's America's Best Comics imprint and writing and penciling a two-page X-Men story in X-Men: Millennial Visions, his final collaboration to date with inker Cam Smith. Kin, a six-issue miniseries created, written and penciled by Frank, was published under Image's Top Cow imprint. The story tells of a secret government agency named S.I.A. who discovers that a race of neanderthal men exists in the mountains of Alaska and proceed to eliminate them to obtain their technology, which developed differently from that of the rest of the world. The book's protagonist, S.I.A. agent Trey McAloon, is opposed to the agency's plans and confronts them about it, while the book's other main character, Alaskan Park Ranger Elizabeth Leaky, establishes contact with one of the neanderthals.

The miniseries' conclusion was open-ended, with questions left unanswered, but so far no sequel or continuation of the story has been announced. The trade paperback collection of Kin entitled Kin: Descent of Man includes six pages of additional story that were not featured in the original issues.

In 2000, Frank began his first collaboration with J. Michael Straczynski, the television writer and creator of Babylon 5. Frank served as penciller on Straczynski's Midnight Nation, a 12-issue limited series published by Top Cow from 2000 to 2002 under their now-defunct Joe's Comics imprint. The first issue of the series included a five-page interview with Frank and Straczynski. One of the inkers on the series was Jon Sibal, with whom Frank would begin a long-running artistic collaboration that continues to this day.

On 16 July 2002, it was announced that Frank had signed an exclusive contract with Marvel. His first work under this contract was a two-issue story arc on The Avengers issues No. 61–62, written by Geoff Johns and inked by Jon Sibal. In 2003, Frank re-teamed with Straczynski on Supreme Power, a revamp of Marvel's superhero team Squadron Supreme, published under their mature-audience Marvel MAX imprint. With its realism and mature storytelling, the series became Marvel's first MAX title to sell over 100,000 copies, making it their best-selling mature-readers series of all time. The series ran for 18 issues from October 2003 to October 2005.

During his run on Supreme Power, Frank provided covers for a diverse number of Marvel series such as Silver Surfer No. 7; Wolverine/Punisher No. 2; The Incredible Hulk No. 75; issues No. 4 and 6 of the Supreme Power spin-off miniseries, Doctor Spectrum; The Amazing Spider-Man No. 515 and 517; Black Panther No. 10; and numerous others, as well as two pages of interior art for the Avengers: Finale one-shot.

On 10 May 2007, having worked several years on a Marvel exclusive contract, Frank signed a new one with DC Comics. He served as the  artist on Action Comics with writer Geoff Johns. The creative team produced the "Brainiac" storyline in which Superman's adopted father Jonathan Kent was killed. Frank and Johns continued to work on Superman in the Superman: Secret Origin six-issue mini-series. The story features what Johns and DC Executive Editor Dan DiDio called a "definitive" telling of the origin story of Superman, dealing with his life in Smallville, his first adventure with the Legion of Super-Heroes as Superboy, and his arrival in Metropolis and at the Daily Planet.

2010s
In 2012, Frank and Johns collaborated on Batman: Earth One, an  original graphic novel set on Earth-one of the DC Multiverse. The novel is the first in a series of graphic novels that redefines Batman. Since 2017, Johns and Frank have worked together on Doomsday Clock, a limited series featuring Superman and Doctor Manhattan.

Work in other media
In 1990, prior working in the comics industry, Gary Frank produced a book titled Rovers: Portrait of a Football Team, which featured caricatures of a number of Bristol Rovers F.C. players from the 1989–90 season. He wrote it in conjunction with then-Rovers player Geoff Twentyman.

Frank's artwork was featured during the finale of the TV series Smallville when the character Chloe Sullivan is shown reading a Superman comic book to her son.

Bibliography
Comics work (interior pencil art) includes:

DC Comics

Action Comics #858–863, 866–870, 900, Annual #10 (2007–11)
The Batman Chronicles #10 (1997)
Batman: Dark Knight Dynasty (among other artists) (1998)
Batman: Earth One (2012)
Batman: Earth One - Volume Two (2015)
Batman: Earth One - Volume Three (2021)
Black Canary/Oracle: Birds of Prey, one-shot (1996)
Bullets and Bracelets #1 (Amalgam Comics, 1996)
Countdown #30 (General Zod) (2007)
DC Universe: Legacies, limited series, (Blue Beetle) #10 (2011)
DC Rebirth, one shot (among other artists) (2016)
Doomsday Clock  #1–12 (2017–2019)
Gen¹³ vol. 2 #37–41 (Wildstorm (1999)
JLA #15 (1998)
Just Imagine Stan Lee With Gary Frank Creating Shazam (2002)
Justice League, vol. 2, (Shazam!) #7–11, No. 0, #14–16, #18–21 (2012–13)
Supergirl, vol. 4, #1–9 (1996–97)
Superman: New Krypton Special, one-shot (among other artists) (2008)
Superman: Secret Origin, miniseries, #1–6 (2009–10)
Tangent Comics: The Flash #1  (1997)
Tom Strong #7 (America's Best Comics, 2000)
War of the Supermen #0 (among other artists) (2010)
Wonder Woman Annual #1 (2007)

Marvel Comics

The Avengers vol. 3 #61–62 (2003)
Avengers Finale (among other artists) (2005)
Dark Angel #6 (1992)
Doctor Strange Sorcerer Supreme #82–83 (1995)
The Incredible Hulk, vol. 2, #403–411, 413–418, 420–423, 425 (1993–95)
The Incredible Hulk, vol. 3, #100–101, 106–107 (2007)
Motormouth #1-4 (1992)
Motormouth & Killpower #6 (1992)
Sabretooth Special # 1 (1995)
Squadron Supreme vol. 2 #1–5, 7 (2006)
Supreme Power #1–18 (2003–05)
X-Men: Prime (among other artists) (1995)

Other publishers
Gen¹³ vol. 2 #25–36 (Image Comics 1997–99)
Godwheel #1 (Malibu Comics, 1995)
Kin #1–6 (Image Comics, 2000)
Midnight Nation #1–12 (Image omics, 2000–01)
Vampirella/Dracula: The Centennial (Harris Publications, 1997)

References

External links

Gary Frank at Mike's Amazing World of Comics
Gary Frank at the Unofficial Handbook of Marvel Comics Creators
Gary Frank at 2000 AD online

1969 births
Artists from Bristol
British comics artists
Date of birth missing (living people)
Inkpot Award winners
Living people